Okruzhnaya is a station on the Lyublinsko–Dmitrovskaya line of the Moscow Metro between Petrovsko-Razumovskaya and Verkhniye Likhobory. The extension of the Lyublinsko–Dmitrovskaya line between Petrovsko-Razumovskaya and Seligerskaya, including Okruzhnaya  opened on 22 March 2018. The station is in Timiryazevsky District of Moscow, at the intersection of Lokomotivny Lane and Tretiy Nizhnelikhoborsky Lane.

Transfers
Transfers to the Okruzhnaya station of the Moscow Central Circle and to the Okruzhnaya railway station of D1 available.

References

Moscow Metro stations
Lyublinsko-Dmitrovskaya Line
Railway stations in Russia opened in 2018
Railway stations located underground in Russia